Firefox Sync, originally branded Mozilla Weave, is a browser synchronization feature for Firefox web browsers. It allows users to partially synchronize bookmarks, browsing history, preferences, passwords, filled forms, add-ons, and the last 25 opened tabs across multiple computers. The feature is now included in Firefox and it's being implemented in Thunderbird.

It keeps user data on Mozilla servers, but according to Mozilla the data is encrypted in such a way that no third party, not even Mozilla, can access user information. It is also possible for the user to host their own Firefox Sync servers, or indeed, for any entity to do so.

Firefox Sync was originally an add-on for Mozilla Firefox 3.x and SeaMonkey 2.0, but it has been a built-in feature since Firefox 4.0 and SeaMonkey 2.1.

Firefox Sync is built on top of Firefox Accounts as of Firefox 29, and therefore Firefox 29 and later cannot sync with Firefox 28 and earlier.

Firefox Home

Firefox Home was a companion application for the iPhone and iPod Touch based on the Firefox Sync technology. Firefox Home was not considered a web browser, as it would launch pages in either an embedded viewer or by switching to the Safari app.  In December 2014, Mozilla announced Firefox for iOS, a version of the Firefox browser for iOS, which includes Firefox Sync support for syncing Firefox's browsing history, bookmarks, and recent tabs.

Sync Server
Mozilla also offers a synchronization server application for use with Firefox Sync, for users and businesses that prefer to host their own synchronization data.

See also
Comparison of browser synchronizers

References

External links
Firefox Sync
Firefox Mobile
Run your own Sync Server (older)
Github page of iOS client

Cloud applications
Firefox extensions merged to Firefox